La Libertad Province is a province of the Colombian Department of Boyacá. The province is formed by 4 municipalities. The province bears its name for the liberty gained from the Spanish Empire after the independence of Gran Colombia.

Municipalities 
Labranzagrande • Pajarito • Paya • Pisba

References 

Provinces of Boyacá Department